Rhyse Martin (born 1 March 1993) is a Papua New Guinea international rugby league footballer who plays as a  forward for the Leeds Rhinos in the Super League.

He previously played for Canterbury-Bankstown Bulldogs in the NRL.

Background
Martin was born in Cairns, Queensland, Australia, and is of Papua New Guinean descent through his father, who is from Hula in the Central Province.

Martin was raised in the Whitsundays. As a teenager, Martin moved to Townsville, where he attended Kirwan State High School and played for Townsville Brothers.

He played his junior rugby league for the Proserpine Brahmans. After graduating in 2010, Martin moved to Sydney to join the Sydney Roosters.

Playing career

Early career
In 2011, Martin played for the Sydney Roosters SG Ball Cup side. Martin played for the Roosters NYC team in 2012 and 2013, captaining the side. On 20 April 2013, Martin was selected to represent the Queensland under-20 rugby league team against the New South Wales Under-20s rugby league team, playing off the interchange bench in the 36-12 loss at Penrith Stadium. In 2014, Martin joined the Roosters' NRL squad but did not make his first grade debut, spending the season playing for their feeder club, the Newtown Jets. 

On 19 October 2014, Martin made his international debut for Papua New Guinea against Tonga, playing at second-row and kicking 2 goals in the 32-18 win at Lae.
In 2015, Martin returned to North Queensland, joining the newly formed Intrust Super Cup team, the Townsville Blackhawks. On 2 May 2015, Martin played for Papua New Guinea against Fiji in the Melanesian Cup, playing at second-row in the 22-10 loss at Robina Stadium. In May 2016, Martin was selected again for Papua New Guinea for the Melanesian Cup but withdrew due to personal reasons. Martin again played for the Townsville Blackhawks in 2016 and was named at second-row in the 2016 Intrust Super Cup team of the year. On 14 September 2016, Martin signed a two-year deal with the Canterbury-Bankstown Bulldogs. Martin spent 2017 playing for the Bulldogs NSW Cup team. Martin played in all 4 matches for Papua New Guinea, scoring 2 tries and kicking 16 goals in their 2017 Rugby League World Cup campaign.

2018
After showing good form for the Canterbury NSW Cup team, Martin finally had the chance to make his NRL debut at 25 years old.

In round 9 of the 2018 NRL season, Martin made his NRL debut for the Canterbury-Bankstown Bulldogs against the Brisbane Broncos, starting at second-row and scoring a try with his first ever touch in Canterbury's unlucky last second 22-20 loss at Suncorp Stadium.

After the mid-season departure Moses Mbye to the Wests Tigers and Martin was cementing a starting spot at second-row, Martin took over the goal kicking duties. On 23 June 2018, Martin played for Papua New Guinea against Fiji in the Melanesian Cup, playing at second-row and kicking 5 goals in the 26-14 win at Campbelltown Stadium.

In round 17 against the Canberra Raiders, Martin became the first NRL player to score 24 points in a losing side. Martin scored 3 tries in the second half and kicked 6 goals in Canterbury's heartbreaking 32-28 loss after they gave up a 28-14 with 6 minutes to full-time at Belmore Oval.

On 23 July 2018, Martin re-signed with Canterbury-Bankstown for a year to the end of the 2018 season. Before the club's round 23 match against the New Zealand Warriors, Martin made a 4-second cameo for Canterbury's NSW Cup team against the North Sydney Bears, all because Martin played in 7 matches for Canterbury's NSW Cup team before being elevated to first-grade but needed 8 ISP appearances so he can play in the NSW Cup Finals series.

Martin finished his debut year in the NRL with him playing in 14 matches, scoring 4 tries and produced the greatest goalkicking for the season, converting 36 goals from 38 attempts at an incredible 94.7 per cent and being the highest point-scorer with 88 for the club in the 2018 NRL season.

As the Canterbury first-grade squad didn't make the finals, Martin continued to play for the club's NSW Cup team, being the Captain and helping them make it into the NSW Cup Grand Final. On 23 September 2018, Martin played at second-row in the Canterbury-Bankstown NSW Cup Grand Final against Newtown, kicking 3 goals in the 18-12 victory at Leichhardt Oval. In the following week, on 30 September 2018, Martin played at second-row in the State Championship Final against Queensland Cup winners the Redcliffe Dolphins, scoring the first try of the match and kicking 5 goals in the 42-18 win. On 6 October 2018, Martin played for Papua New Guinea against Prime Minister’s XIII, playing at second-row, scoring a try and kicking 3 goals in the 34-18 loss at Port Moresby. On 17 December 2018, Martin was named in the emerging Queensland squad.

2019
After being one of Canterbury's shining lights from last season, Martin was a surprising omission from the first two matches of the 2019 NRL season.

It was understood that Martin has fallen foul of the coaching staff after he returned to pre-season training carrying a little too much condition and speculation of concerns with his defence.

Martin would return in Round 3 against the Wests Tigers for the demoted Raymond Faitala-Mariner, starting at lock and kicking three goals in Canterbury's 22-8 win at Campbelltown Stadium.

In round 4 against the Melbourne Storm, despite having a great record with his goal kicking, fate was against him in the final minutes of the game after Canterbury winger Reimis Smith scored a try in the corner was made the score 18-16 and with the chance to tie up the match at full-time but unfortunately missed the conversion and Melbourne escaped with the 18-16 win at AAMI Park.
Martin signed a two-year deal with Leeds. After falling out of favour with Canterbury coach Dean Pay.

2020
On 17 October 2020, he played in the 2020 Challenge Cup Final victory for Leeds over Salford at Wembley Stadium.

2021
Martin made 25 appearances for Leeds in the 2021 Super League season including the semi-final defeat against St Helens RFC as the club made it to within one game of the grand final.

2022
In round 22 of the 2022 Super League season, Martin scored two tries and kicked seven goals in Leeds 34-14 victory over Salford.
On 24 September 2022, Martin played for Leeds in their 24-12 loss to St Helens RFC in the 2022 Super League Grand Final.  Martin scored a second half try and kicked two goals in the match.
In the second round of the group stage in the 2021 Rugby League World Cup, Martin had the chance to set a new world record for most consecutive conversions in a row. Martin had previously kicked 41 successful goals since July 2022. Martin missed the conversion attempt to set the new world record during Papua New Guinea's 32-16 victory over the Cook Islands.

Personal life
Martin's older brother, Tyson, played for the Mackay Cutters and was also a Papua New Guinean international.

References

External links

Leeds Rhinos profile
SL profile
Canterbury-Bankstown Bulldogs profile

1993 births
Living people
Australian people of Papua New Guinean descent
Australian rugby league players
Australian expatriate sportspeople in England
Canterbury-Bankstown Bulldogs players
Combined Nationalities rugby league team players
Leeds Rhinos players
Newtown Jets NSW Cup players
Papua New Guinea national rugby league team captains
Papua New Guinea national rugby league team players
Rugby league players from Cairns
Rugby league second-rows
Townsville Blackhawks players